The 5.5 Metre was an event on the 2012 Vintage Yachting Games program at Lake Como,  Italy. Five out of the nine scheduled race were entered. 45 sailors, on 15 boats, from 7 nations entered.

Race area and Course

Of the three Campo's (Race Area's) available for the 2012 Vintage Yachting Games at Lake Como Campo Alpha was used for the 5.5 Metre event. In general this Campo is situated in North of Dervio.

For the 2012 edition of the Vintage Yachting Games three different courses were available. The 5.5 Metre could use only course 2.

Wind conditions 

The Northern part of Lake Como was reportedly a thermic wind venue. In this time of year the normal situation is that at about 13:00 the Swiss mountains are heated up and a Southern wind hits the racing areas with about 10 to 14 knots. As result of this no races were scheduled in the morning. Unfortunately during the event the temperatures in Switzerland were low. Also was the thermal South breeze battling with the gradient wind from the North. As result the actual wind did not came above the 8 knots during the races and was instable at times.

Campo Alpha has normally a tendency to have a slightly higher wind speed than Campo Charlie this due to the fact that it is more Northern than Charlie so that the Southern thermal breeze is strengthened.

Races

Summary 
In the 5.5 Metre five out of the planned nine races were completed.

The fleet of the 5.5 Metre (Olympic between 1952 – 1968) was very impressive. With 15 boats racing it was not the largest fleet but the size of the boats and the sail area made the class very present at Lake Como. Since all 5.5’s are built from a different design, the speed of each boat can differ as well. But the racing remained close and competitive. The class had chosen to bring the classic designs to the Vintage. This means boats designed in their Olympic period from 1952 to 1968. The choice of design period for the next Vintage is still open.
The races went between William Borel, Yves Duclos-Grenet, Adrien Baumelle, from France, Anders Nordman, Robert Segercrantz, Johan Hjelt, from Finland and the team of Olympian Hubert Reich, Dr. Wolfgang Oehler, Christian Hemmerich, from Germany sailing in their Olympic boat from 1964. In the end the Finnish team took the gold followed by the German team of “Biwi” Reich.

Results 

 dnc = did not compete
 dns = did not start
 dnf = did not finish
 dsq = disqualified
 ocs = on course side
 ret = retired after finish
 Crossed out results did not count for the total result.

Daily standings

Victors

Notes

References 
 

5.5 Metre